David Čada (born 5 August 1986) is a professional Czech football player who currently plays for FK Baník Sokolov.

References

External links
 Profile at FKSokolov.cz

Czech footballers
1986 births
Living people
FK Baník Sokolov players

Association football midfielders